The Rural Municipality of Craik No. 222 is a rural municipality (RM) in the Canadian province of Saskatchewan within Census Division No. 7 and  Division No. 2. The RM is centrally located between the cities of Regina and Saskatoon.

History 
The RM of Craik No. 222 incorporated as a rural municipality on December 9, 1912.

Geography

Communities and localities 
The following urban municipalities are surrounded by the RM:

Towns
Craik

Villages
Aylesbury

Parks
The following parks are within the RM:
Craik and District Regional Park

Demographics 

Government 
The RM of Craik No. 222 is governed by an elected municipal council and an appointed administrator that meets on the second Thursday of every month. The reeve of the RM is Neil Dolman while its administrator is JoAnne Yates. The RM's office is located in Craik.

References 

C